The 1944–45 season was Manchester United's sixth season in the non-competitive War League during the Second World War.

On 15 February 1945, United manager Walter Crickmer had resigned and four days later on 19 February 1945, the Scottish manager Matt Busby was signed, but it was not until 1 October that Busby officially took over at the club.

Many of Manchester United's players went off to fight in the war, but for those who remained, the Football League organised a special War League.

War League North Regional League First Championship

War League North Regional League Second Championship

References

Manchester United F.C. seasons
Manchester United